Paraburkholderia sartisoli is a gram-negative, aerobic catalase and oxidase-positive rod-shaped bacterium from the genus Paraburkholderia and the family Burkholderiaceae which was isolated from polycyclic aromatic hydrocarbon contaminated soil in New Zealand.

References

sartisoli
Bacteria described in 2008